Bowd–Munson Company was an architectural firm in Lansing, Michigan. The firm was a partnership between Edwyn A. Bowd and Orlie Munson.

Bowd was born in England. He designed the Lewis Cass Building. He also designed many buildings at Michigan State University (MSU) in East Lansing beginning with Old Botany in 1892 and continuing on his own and at the firm with Marshall Hall, Agriculture Hall, Giltner Hall (1913 portion), IM Recreative Sports Circle, and Spartan Stadium. The firm designed most of the buildings on the MSU campus until 1940 often in Collegiate Gothic style.

Work
 Charles E. Chamberlain Federal Building & Post Office, 315 W. Allegan St. In Lansing, Bowd-Munson Co. 
 J.W. Knapp Company Building, 300 S. Washington Avenue in Lansing, Bowd–Munson Company. Streamline Moderne in style.
 Ottawa Street Power Station, 217 E. Ottawa St. Lansing, MI Bowd-Munson Co.
 Ottawa Street Power Station
 Spartan Stadium (East Lansing, Michigan)
 Demonstration Hall
 Accident Fund Company National Headquarters (1940)
 Masonic Temple Building (Lansing, Michigan) (1924) (now the main building for Cooley Law School) in Lansing 
 Michigan School for the Blind Abigail Building (1916) in Lansing
 Ingham County Courthouse (1904) in Mason, Michigan
 Michigan State University Museum
 First Baptist Church in Lansing
 Berkey Hall (1947) 
 Spartan Stadium (both the 1923 original and the 1959 renovation)
 Jenison Field House (1940)
 Ionia Armory / Community Center (1908), Ionia, MI

References

Defunct architecture firms based in Michigan